Kaya Union is a union parishad situated at Kumarkhali Upazila,  in Kushtia District, Khulna Division of Bangladesh. There are 14 villages and 12 mouzas in the union.

References

External links
 

Unions of Khulna Division
Unions of Kumarkhali Upazila
Unions of Kushtia District